Annette Schortinghuis-Poelenije (born 1 January 1952) is a retired Dutch rower. Her team finished fourth at the 1975 World Championships and eights at the 1976 Summer Olympics in the coxed eights event.

References

External links
 
 
 

1952 births
Living people
Dutch female rowers
Olympic rowers of the Netherlands
Rowers at the 1976 Summer Olympics
Sportspeople from Gouda, South Holland